The King's Bargemaster is a subordinate officer of the Royal Household of the Sovereign of the United Kingdom.  Until the mid-19th century, the Royal Family frequently used a Royal barge for transport along the River Thames. The role of the King's Bargemaster was to oversee this. The tradition of the Bargemaster dates back to 1215, with the signing of Magna Carta at Runnymede. The role is now largely ceremonial.

The Bargemaster is responsible for the Royal Watermen, chosen from the ranks of the Thames Watermen who operate tugs and launches on the river.  There are 24 Royal Watermen, each of whom receives an annual salary of £3.50.

Duties

The ceremonial duties include state occasions involving the Thames. In recent years for example, they have helped organise and facilitate river Pageants for the Golden Jubilee and Diamond Jubilee.

 Onshore duties include acting as footmen on royal carriages during State visits, royal weddings and jubilees. At the coronation, the Royal Watermen walk in the procession behind The King’s Bargemaster. At the State Opening of Parliament, the King’s Bargemaster and four Royal Watermen travel as boxmen on coaches, guarding the regalia when it is conveyed from Buckingham Palace to Westminster and back.

The privately owned charter vessel  was transformed into a royal barge for the Queen's use during her Diamond Jubilee. On 3 June 2012, the barge carried the Queen, the Duke of Edinburgh and other members of the Royal Family, in the Thames Diamond Jubilee Pageant.

List of Bargemasters

Chris Livett (2018–present)
Paul Ludwig (2004–c. 2018)
Kenny Dwan (2003–2004)
Robert Crouch, MVO (c. 1991–2003)
Edwin Hunt, MVO (1978–1990)
Albert Barry, MVO (1951–1977)
Ernest Barry (1950–1951)
J. T. Phelps (c. 1938)
James Messenger (1862–1901)

See also
Gloriana (barge)
MV Spirit of Chartwell

References

Positions within the British Royal Household
Ceremonial officers in the United Kingdom